Goniec Polski is a weekly magazine for the Polish community in the United Kingdom that is published in London.

References

External links
Goniec Polski's website
Goniec's website

News magazines published in the United Kingdom
Weekly magazines published in the United Kingdom
Magazines published in London
Polish-language magazines
Polish-British culture
Magazines established in 2001
2001 establishments in the United Kingdom